Télématin is a French breakfast television news show, broadcast on France 2 since January 7, 1985. It is broadcast in Metropolitan France weekdays from 6:30 to 9:00 am CET.  TV5 broadcast the show in Canada in its 150-minute entirety until September 2011: since then, a shortened 90-minute version is shown between 6:30 and 8:00 am Eastern Time.

Télématin has been hosted for its entire run by William Leymergie, who also serves as the show's producer. The show is daily seen by around 40% of the French morning audience, a very high percentage for French TV.

In Metropolitan France, newscasts are presented at 7:00, 7:30 and 8:00, with newsflashes at 6:30 and 8:50, and two press reviews at 7:20 and 8:30. The 6:30, 7:30 and 8:50 newscasts are usually presented by a female reader and the hourly newscasts by a male. The usual readers are Nathanaël de Rincquesen, Sophie Le Saint, Julien Benedetto, Sophie Gastrain, Patrice Romedenne and Frédéric Vion.

External links
 Official website 
 Télématin – TV5 Canada 
 

French television news shows
1985 French television series debuts
1980s French television series